Matteo Ivaldi (born 17 April 1971) is an Italian yacht racer who competed in the 1996 Summer Olympics and in the 2000 Summer Olympics.

References

External links
 
 
 

1971 births
Living people
Italian male sailors (sport)
Olympic sailors of Italy
Sailors at the 1996 Summer Olympics – 470
Sailors at the 2000 Summer Olympics – 470
Competitors at the 1993 Mediterranean Games
Mediterranean Games gold medalists for Italy
20th-century Italian people
21st-century Italian people